På vårt sätt is a studio album from Scotts, released on 19 December 2008. The album topped the Swedish albums chart between 2 and 23 January 2009. The album featured the single "Om igen", peaking at number 27 on the Swedish Singles Chart and also charting at Svensktoppen. The other recordings were cover versions, many of them of songs performed by Scotts during Dansbandskampen 2008.

Track listing

Personnel 
Henrik Strömberg – vocals, guitar
Claes Linder – keyboards
Roberto Mårdstam – bass
Per-Erik "Lillen" Tagesson – drums
Sax: Martin Lindqvist
Trumpet: Ingmar Andersson

Charts

References 

2008 albums
Scotts (band) albums